Stuart Lennie (16 October 1936 – 15 October 2017) was an Australian rules footballer who played for the St Kilda Football Club in the Victorian Football League (VFL).

He was recruited by St Kilda in 1955 from Hampton Rovers, where he had kicked over 100 goals the previous year.

Notes

External links 

1936 births
2017 deaths
Australian rules footballers from Victoria (Australia)
St Kilda Football Club players